Ostermünchen station is a railway station in the village of Ostermünchen, in the municipality of Tuntenhausen, located in the Rosenheim district of Bavaria, Germany.

References

Railway stations in Bavaria
Buildings and structures in Rosenheim (district)
Railway stations in Germany opened in 1871
1871 establishments in Bavaria